Grant Richards (December 21, 1911 – July 4, 1963) was an American actor and voice actor, who appeared mainly in movies in the late 1930s through to the late 1950s.

Richards was born in New York City.  He was married to actress Joan Valerie.

In 1937, he became the first actor in the Federal Theatre Project to gain a film contract, signing with the Major Pictures company.

His films include On Such a Night (1937) and Guns, Girls, and Gangsters (1959). Richards made three guest appearances on Perry Mason: as Jerry Haywood in the 1958 episodes "The Case of the Haunted Husband," and as Captain Kennedy in "The Case of the Sardonic Sargeant"; followed by the role of murder victim George Sherwin in the 1961 episode, "The Case of the Missing Melody". He also appeared in several episodes of ABC's The Untouchables.

In 1958, he played the gunfighter and saloon owner Luke Short in an episode of western series, The Life and Legend of Wyatt Earp. In 1962 he played Keeler, a crooked gambler, in The Rifleman episode “Tinhorn”.

He died in a car accident in Los Angeles, aged 51.

Filmography

References

External links
 

American male film actors
1911 births
1963 deaths
Male actors from New York City
Road incident deaths in California
20th-century American male actors
Federal Theatre Project people